Rabbit à la Berlin (Polish: Królik po berlińsku, Deutsch: Mauerhase) is a 2009 documentary film, directed by Bartek Konopka. The script was written by Konopka and Mateusz Romaszkan, and the movie was a joint German-Polish production with the producers Heino Deckert and Anna Wydra. It was nominated for an Oscar in 2010 for Best Documentary, Short Subject. It has also won awards at the Kraków Film Festival and the Hot Docs Canadian International Documentary Festival.

The film tells the story of the Berlin Wall but from point of view of a group of wild rabbits that inhabited the zone between the two walls separating West Berlin from East Germany during the Cold War.

See also
 Involuntary park

References

External links

Rabbit à la Berlin review at culture.pl

2009 films
Polish short documentary films
German short documentary films
2009 short documentary films
Cold War films
Berlin Wall in popular culture
Films about the Berlin Wall
Documentary films about Berlin
Documentary films about urban animals
Films about rabbits and hares
2000s German films